Piz Cristanas is a mountain in the Sesvenna Range of the Alps, located east of S-charl in the canton of Graubünden. It lies on the range between the Val Sesvenna and the Val d'Uina, a few hundred metres west of the Italian border.

References

External links
 Piz Cristanas on Hikr

Mountains of Graubünden
Mountains of the Alps
Alpine three-thousanders
Mountains partially in Italy
Mountains of Switzerland
Scuol